is a former Japanese football player.

Club statistics

References

External links

1985 births
Living people
Association football people from Hiroshima Prefecture
Japanese footballers
J1 League players
J2 League players
Japan Football League players
Sanfrecce Hiroshima players
Ehime FC players
FC Gifu players
Gainare Tottori players
Japanese expatriate footballers
Japanese expatriate sportspeople in Paraguay
Expatriate footballers in Paraguay
Club Guaraní players
Sportivo Trinidense footballers
Sportivo Luqueño players
Association football forwards